Gun Play is a 1935 American Western film directed by Albert Herman and starring Guinn 'Big Boy' Williams, Marion Shilling and Frank Yaconelli.

Cast
 Guinn 'Big Boy' Williams as Bill Williams 
 Marion Shilling as Madge Holt
 Frank Yaconelli as Frank Gorman 
 Hal Taliaferro as George Holt 
 Charles K. French as Old John Holt 
 Tom London as Meeker
 Roger Williams as Cal
 Gordon Griffith as Mark
 Barney Beasley as Pete
 Dick Botiller as General Tirado 
 Julian Rivero as Young Pedro
 Helen Gibson as Woman at dance

References

Bibliography
 Pitts, Michael R. Poverty Row Studios, 1929-1940. McFarland & Company, 2005.

External links
 

1935 films
1935 Western (genre) films
American Western (genre) films
Films directed by Albert Herman
1930s English-language films
1930s American films